Seokgye Station is a station on Seoul Subway Line 1 and Line 6. The name of this station does not refer to any one neighborhood in this area; its name comes from an acronym of Seokgwan-dong and Wolgye-dong, located in Seongbuk-gu and Nowon-gu, respectively.

References 

Seoul Metropolitan Subway stations
Metro stations in Seongbuk District
Metro stations in Nowon District
Railway stations in South Korea opened in 1985